The Union American Methodist Episcopal Church, which is usually called the U.A.M.E. Church, was formally organized as a separate denomination in 1865 by some congregations of the African Union Church founded by Peter Spencer in 1813.

In May 2012, The Union American Methodist Episcopal Church entered into full communion with the African Methodist Episcopal Church, African Methodist Episcopal Zion Church, African Union Methodist Protestant Church, Christian Methodist Episcopal Church, and the United Methodist Church, in which these Churches agreed to "recognize each other’s churches, share sacraments, and affirm their clergy and ministries."

See also
Spencer Churches
List of African Methodist Episcopal Churches

References

African Methodist Episcopal Church
Historically African-American Christian denominations
History of Methodism in the United States
Union